The 1969 Railway Cup Hurling Championship was the 43rd series of the hurling Railway Cup. Four matches were played between 23 February and 6 April 1969. It was contested by Connacht, Leinster, Munster and Ulster.

Munster were the winners for the second year in-a-row and for the 31st occasion overall.

Format

Preliminary round: (1 match) This was a single match between Connacht and Ulster, generally regarded as the two 'weakest' teams in the championship.  One team was eliminated at this stage while the winning team advanced to the semi-final.

Semi-final: (1 match) This was a single match between the winners of the preliminary round and Leinster.  One team was eliminated at this stage while the winning team advanced to the final.

Final: (1 match) This winners of the semi-final and Munster, who received a bye to this stage, contested this game.

Results

Railway Cup

Top scorers

Season

Sources

 Donegan, Des, The Complete Handbook of Gaelic Games (DBA Publications Limited, 2005).

Railway Cup Hurling Championship
Railway Cup Hurling Championship
Hurling